Gabriella Szűcs (born 7 March 1988) is a Hungarian water polo player. At the 2012, 2016 and 2020 Summer Olympics, she competed for the Hungary women's national water polo team in the women's tournament.

See also
 List of World Aquatics Championships medalists in water polo

References

External links
 

1988 births
Living people
Hungarian female water polo players
Water polo players at the 2012 Summer Olympics
Water polo players at the 2016 Summer Olympics
Water polo players at the 2020 Summer Olympics
World Aquatics Championships medalists in water polo
Medalists at the 2020 Summer Olympics
Olympic bronze medalists for Hungary in water polo
Sportspeople from Székesfehérvár
21st-century Hungarian women